is the 16th single by Japanese entertainer Akina Nakamori. Written by Ikki Matsumoto and Ken Satō, the single was released on September 25, 1986, by Warner Pioneer through the Reprise label. It was also the third single from her third compilation album CD'87.

The single became Nakamori's 13th No. 1 on Oricon's weekly singles chart and sold over 318,300 copies.

Track listing

Charts

References

External links 
 
 
 

1986 singles
1986 songs
Akina Nakamori songs
Japanese-language songs
Warner Music Japan singles
Reprise Records singles
Oricon Weekly number-one singles